The Oriental Roller is a breed of fancy pigeon developed over many years of selective breeding. Oriental Rollers, along with all other varieties of domesticated pigeons, are descended from the rock pigeon (Columba livia).

Flying style

The key hallmark of the Oriental Roller is its flying style. They show a variety of different figures in the air, which are single somersaults, double somersaults, rolling (a number of uncountable somersaults), rotation with open wings, nose dives, sudden change of direction during flight and very rarely axial turns. Some breeds fly up to 1000 m high, others stay in the air for several hours.

The aerobatics that these Oriental Rollers perform are comparable to those of the Galatz  Roller and Birmingham Roller pigeons.

See also 
List of pigeon breeds

References

External links
 Oriental Rollers - Pigeonpedia

Pigeon breeds